Georgios Delizisis (born 1 December 1987) is a Greek professional footballer who plays as a centre-back for Super League 2 club Niki Volos.

Club career

Aris Thessaloniki
On 27 July 2017, Aris Thessaloniki officially announced the signing of the experienced defender on a two-year contract. On 25 November 2017, he scored his first goal in a 2–1 home win against Panachaiki, after a cross from Vangelis Platellas.
On 4 February 2018, he scored the only goal in a 1–0 home win against Sparti. On 1 April 2018, his goal gave his team an important home win against Doxa Drama, edging one step closer to the promotion.

On 5 March 2019, Delizisis signed a contract extension, running until the summer of 2021.

On 15 June 2021, Aris renewed their contract for another year, i.e. until 2022.

Career statistics

References

External links
Myplayer
Transfer To AEL

1987 births
Living people
Greek footballers
Association football defenders
Gamma Ethniki players
Football League (Greece) players
Super League Greece players
Super League Greece 2 players
Eordaikos 2007 F.C. players
Niki Volos F.C. players
Apollon Smyrnis F.C. players
Aris Thessaloniki F.C. players
Athlitiki Enosi Larissa F.C. players
Footballers from Kozani
21st-century Greek people